Stenolepis is a genus of lizard in the family Gymnophthalmidae, a family commonly known as microteiids or spectacled lizards. The genus Stenolepis contains a single species, Stenolepis ridleyi, commonly known as the Pernambuco teiid. The species is endemic to Brazil, and the common name refers to its type locality in Pernambuco state in northeast Brazil.

Etymology
The specific name, ridleyi, is in honor of British botanist Henry Nicholas Ridley.

Geographic range
S. ridleyi is found in the Brazilian states of Ceará and Pernambuco. The type locality given by Boulenger is "the forest of Iguarasse, Pernambuco".

Habitat
The natural habitats of S. ridleyi are forest and Savanna.

Reproduction
S. ridleyi is oviparous.

References

Further reading
Boulenger GA (1887). "Description of a new Genus of Lizards of the Family Teiidæ". Proc. Zool. Soc. London 1887: 640–642. (Stenolepis, new genus, p. 640; S. ridleyi, new species, pp. 640–642, Figures a-d).

Gymnophthalmidae
Monotypic lizard genera
Reptiles of Brazil
Endemic fauna of Brazil
Taxa named by George Albert Boulenger